Scaeva mecogramma is a European species of hoverfly.

References

Diptera of Europe
Syrphinae
Insects described in 1860
Taxa named by Jacques-Marie-Frangile Bigot